Marcel Beifus (born 27 October 2002) is a German professional footballer who plays as a centre-back for FC St. Pauli. He has represented Germany internationally at U17 and U19 levels.

Career
Beifus joined 2. Bundesliga club FC St. Pauli from VfL Wolfsburg in summer 2021. On 19 September 2021, he made his debut for FC St. Pauli in the league, coming on as a substitute against FC Ingolstadt.

References

External links
 
 

Living people
2002 births
People from Wolfenbüttel
German footballers
Association football central defenders
Germany youth international footballers
2. Bundesliga players
Regionalliga players
VfL Wolfsburg II players
FC St. Pauli II players
FC St. Pauli players